The Ruger Precision Rifle (RPR) is a bolt-action rifle introduced by Sturm, Ruger & Co. on 17 July 2015.

Models
The RPR was originally announced in the following calibers and configurations:

 .308 Win. with 1:10 twist,  barrel, weighing <
 6.5 Creedmoor with a 1:8 twist,  barrel, weighing  
 .243 Winchester with a 1:7.7 twist,  barrel, weighing 

A newer Ruger Precision Rifle "Gen 2" was announced on 6 May 2016 with several enhancements over the original. The new version includes a new handguard, a hybrid muzzle brake (5/8-24 threaded), and a billet aluminum bolt shroud. The announced models were:

 .308 Win with 1:10 RH twist,  barrel, weighing 
 6mm Creedmoor with a 1:7.7 RH twist,  barrel, weighing 
 6.5mm Creedmoor with 1:8 RH twist,  barrel, weighing 

A model chambered in 5.56×45mm NATO was announced on 27 March 2017. It has a 1:7 RH twist,  barrel, weighing 

Models chambered in the magnum cartridges .338 Lapua Magnum, 300 Win Mag, and 300 PRC went on sale in 2018. 

 .338 Lapua Magnum with 1:9.375 RH twist, 26 in (66 cm) barrel, weighing 15.2 lb (6.8 kg)
 .300 Winchester Magnum with 1:9 RH twist, 26 in (66 cm) barrel, weighing 15.2 lb (6.8 kg)
 300 PRC with 1:9 RH twist, 26 in (66 cm) barrel, weighing 15.2 lb (6.8 kg)

Technical features 
The Ruger Precision Rifle has a proprietary Pre-Fit barrel system. Pre-chambered "Drop-In Ready" barrels can be purchased, and the correct headspace is set using a proprietary barrel nut design. The barrel is threaded to fit the Ruger action threads. This way, a competent gunsmith only needs an AR-15 barrel wrench and proper headspace gauges to fit a new barrel. This eliminates the need for machining by the gunsmith as with traditional barrel mounting solutions.

The RPR is compatible with AR-style handgrips, buttstocks and some types of handguards. The trigger is proprietary, but aftermarket triggers are available.

Recalls
Ruger issued a safety bulletin for certain RPRs on 10 Aug 2017. The following serial number ranges are potentially affected: 1800-26274 to 1800-78345 or 1801-00506 to 1801-30461.

References

External links
Product page

Ruger Precision Rifle
Bolt-action rifles of the United States
5.56 mm firearms